Achama is a location in Cameroon located in the department of Momo in the Northwest Region. It is part of the commune of Widikum-Boffe and consists of two villages, Lower Achama and Upper Achama.

Population 

According to the census of 2005 there are 420 inhabitants in Lower Achama and 414 in Upper Achama.
 
They speak menka, a Grassfields language.

See also
Communes of Cameroon

Notes and references

Annexes

Bibliography 
  Charlene Ayotte and Michael Ayotte, Rapid appraisal and lexicostatistical analysis surveys of Atong, Ambele, and Menka. Widikum-Menka Subdivision. Momo Division.  North West Province, SIL International, 2002, 43 p.
 P. Tjeega and Hubert Elingui, Dictionnaire des villages de Momo, Ministère de l'enseignement supérieur et de la recherche scientifique, Centre géographique national, s. l. [Yaoundé], 1987, 48 p.

External links 
  Widikum , on Communes et villes unies du Cameroun (CVUC)
  Widikum-Boffe Council Development Plan, PNDP, June 2011, 191 p.

Populated places in Cameroon